McAnally–Hilgemann Racing (MHR) is an American professional stock car racing team that competes full-time in the NASCAR Craftsman Truck Series. The team is based in Roseville, California, and is owned by Bill McAnally (in Truck, is co-owned by William Hilgemann). In the NASCAR Truck Series, the team fields the No. 19 Chevrolet Silverado for Christian Eckes and the No. 35 for Jake Garcia and Chase Elliott.

The team also races full-time in the ARCA Menards Series West, as well as part-time in the ARCA Menards Series as Bill McAnally Racing (BMR), fielding the No. 16 Chevrolet SS full-time for Tanner Reif and the No. 19 Chevrolet SS part-time for Cole Moore and Eric Johnson Jr.

History
Bill McAnally first started racing in the Late Model series at All American Speedway in 1990. While preparing to begin his Late Model career he reached out to NAPA to try getting some sponsorship for his car. They agreed to sponsor him, and McAnally won the Late Model division championship in the Whelen All-American Series at the track. NAPA has continued to sponsor the team to this day.

McAnally moved up to the K&N Pro Series West (then called the NASCAR Winston West Series), making two starts that season. The following season he bumped that up to five starts. The 1994 season got off to a bad start when he lost his car and equipment to vandals the night before the season opener. Despite this, McAnally still managed to race in six events while rebuilding his team that year. In 1995 he finally reached his dream of running a full regular-season schedule, finishing ninth in the championship standings. He followed that up with another ninth-place finish in the standings the following year. In total, McAnally made 56 starts between 1992 and 1998 while also working a full-time job as a lineman for a utility company.

In 1999 McAnally was getting ready to retire from racing when a chance meeting took place with a father and son who wanted to go racing. That meeting resulted in Sean Woodside racing for McAnally in 1999. He won the first race of the season at Tucson and went on to win the series championship. McAnally next opened a seat for Brendan Gaughan who went on to win back-to-back titles for BMR in 2000 and 2001 and opened a Camping World Truck Series (then called Craftsman Truck Series) team in the same years. McAnally would add two more titles with driver Eric Holmes in 2008 and 2010. In 2015 and 2016 the team saw even more success, winning back-to-back championships with Chris Eggleston and Todd Gilliland respectively. This made McAnally just the third car owner in the history of the series to win consecutive titles on two separate occasions. They came back just as strong in 2017, winning another championship with Todd Gilliland. McAnally is the only owner in NASCAR history to have eight championships at the touring series level of NASCAR.

In November 2018, it was announced that BMR would reopen a Camping World Truck Series team debuting again at ISM Raceway fielding the No. 19 Toyota Tundra for Derek Kraus. After finishing in the top ten, BMR expanded its inventory to three trucks and committed to running a four-race schedule with Kraus in 2019.
On January 13, 2020, BMR announced a partnership with Bill Hilgemann to form McAnally-Hilgemann Racing. The team fielded the No. 19 Tundra full-time in the Truck Series for Kraus. The following day, the team revealed a new Menards Series West driver lineup of Gio Scelzi, Jesse Love, Holley Hollan, and Gracie Trotter.

In 2021, McAnally's team participated with the Nos. 1 (Jolynn Wilkinson), 4 (Dylan Lupton, Eric Nascimento), 5 (Sebastian Arias), 16 (Jesse Love), 19 (Derek Kraus, Eric Nascimento, Amber Balcaen, Jolynn Wilkinson, Sebastian Arias), and 99 (Cole Moore).

In 2022, McAnally-Hilgemann and McAnally's team will switch to a Chevy, having a technical alliance with GMS Racing. In Truck, Colby Howard participated in the No. 91 (reverse of No. 19) full-time, and Jake Garcia participating in the No. 35 (his late model number) part-time. In ARCA West, Austin Herzog made his first full-time appearance, but was replaced by Landen Lewis after 5 rounds.

Truck No. 19 Results

Truck No. 35 Results

Truck No. 91 Results

References

External links

NASCAR teams